Mastigusa is a genus of  dwarf sheet spiders that was first described by Anton Menge in 1854.  it contains only three species: M. arietina, M. lucifuga, and M. macrophthalma.

References

Araneomorphae genera
Dictynidae
Hahniidae
Spiders of Asia